Tomahawk Lake (Halifax)  is a lake of Halifax Regional Municipality, Nova Scotia, Canada.  The Tomahawk Lake watershed is approximately 1550 hectares and is managed by the Halifax Regional Water Commission as a potential future source of expansion to the municipality's drinking water supply.

See also
List of lakes in Nova Scotia

References

Lakes of Nova Scotia